Wat Pavaranivesh Vihara Ratchawarawihan is a major Buddhist temple (wat) in Phra Nakhon district, Bangkok, Thailand. Being the residence of Nyanasamvara Suvaddhana; the late Supreme Patriarch of Thailand, it is the final resting place of two former kings of Chakri Dynasty; King Vajiravudh (Rama VI) and King Bhumibol Adulyadej (Rama IX). The temple was established in 1824 by Mahasakti Pol Sep, viceroy during the reign of King Rama III (r. 1824–51).

The temple is a center of the Thammayut Nikaya order of Thai Theravada Buddhism, it is the shrine-hall of Phra Phuttha Chinnasi (พระพุทธชินสีห์), a statue of the Buddha which dates to around 1357. Bowonniwet has been a major temple of patronage for the ruling Chakri dynasty. It is where many royal princes and kings studied and served their monkhood, including King Bhumibol and his son, the present king Vajiralongkorn.

Architecture
The golden chedi at the wats shrine carries the relics and ashes of Thai royals. The two viharas are closed to public. The T-shaped bot holds a magnificent Sukhothai-period Buddha, cast in 1257 CE to celebrate freedom from the Khmers.

The murals on the bots interior walls were traditionally light and limited in their subject matter and style. They were painted to appear three-dimensional. Monk artist Khrua In Khong introduced Western style in the murals depicting Buddhist subjects.

Royal patronage and history
In 1836, Prince Bhikkhu Mongkut (ordination name: Vajirañāṇo) arrived at the temple and became its first abbot, founding the Thammayut Nikkaya order. He stayed at the temple for 27 years before acceding the throne of Siam as King Rama IV.

His great-grandson, King Bhumibol Adulyadej (Rama IX; ordination name: Bhumibalo), was ordained a monk at Wat Phra Kaew, and resided in Bowonniwet for 15 days in 1956. Bhumibol's mentor, Somdet Phra Yanasangworn, eventually became abbot of the temple, and later the Supreme Patriarch of Thailand. In 1978, King Bhumibol's son, King Vajiralongkorn (Rama X; ordination name: Vajirālankaraṇo), was also ordained and spent 15 days at Bowonniwet. Several of his sons from his second wife, Yuvadhida Polpraserth, later did the same.

In October 1976, exiled dictator and former Prime Minister, Field Marshal Thanom Kittikachorn, returned to Thailand as a novice monk to enter Bowonniwet. This sparked large public demonstrations and a bloody crackdown that became known as the Thammasat University massacre or the "6 October Event".

List of abbots

Media

Notes

References

 DhammaThai.org A Guide to Meditation Centres in Thailand: Wat Bovornives Vihara, last retrieved 15 September 2006

External links

Bowonniwet Vihara
Phra Nakhon district
Bowonniwet Vihara
1830s in Siam
Thai Dhammayut Buddhist temples
Registered ancient monuments in Bangkok